Ephutomorpha ferruginata is a species of parasitoid wasp in the family Mutillidae endemic to Australia.

References

Mutillidae
Insects described in 1843
Hymenoptera of Australia